Jeff is a 1969 French-Italian crime film financed by Warner Bros.-Seven Arts. Starring Alain Delon and Mireille Darc, it tells the story of a gang of thieves who fall out after a robbery and start killing each other off.

Plot 
In Paris, a gang rob a diamond merchant after abducting his wife and killing his chauffeur. The loot is given to Jeff, their leader, who will take it to a fence in Antwerp and then return to share out the cash proceeds. But he never returns. All of the gang believe he has cheated them, apart from Laurent who still trusts his leader. They leave one member to guard Laurent and go to Jeff's apartment, where they torture his mistress Eva. 

Laurent kills his guard, rescues Eva, and sets off with her to Antwerp. There they find the fence, who says Jeff has the money. The other members find the fence, kill him, and abduct his wife, who they force to tell Eva that Jeff has cheated everybody. Laurent meanwhile has found Jeff's hideaway and kills him. Going to meet Eva, who spent the previous night with him, he finds she has been abducted by a gang member who guns him down.

Cast 
 Alain Delon as Laurent 
 Mireille Darc  as  Eva 
 Georges Rouquier as Jeff 
 Gabriel Jabbour  as  Zucci 
   as  Mme Grunstein 
 Robert Lombard as Grunstein 
   as  Peter 
   as  Lescure  
 Christian Melsen as  Van Hoof  
 Suzanne Flon  as  Mrs. de Groote 
   as Merkès 
 Frédéric de Pasquale  as  Diamant

Production
It was the first film from Delon's production company, Adel Productions. During the making of the film, Delon began a romantic relationship with Mireille Darc which lasted for fifteen years.

Reception
The film was a relative disappointment at the French box office.

References

External links

1969 films
French crime drama films
Films produced by Alain Delon
Films scored by François de Roubaix
Warner Bros. films
1960s French films
Italian crime drama films